General Gordon may refer to:

People

United Kingdom
Lord Adam Gordon (British Army officer) (1726–1801), British Army general
Alexander Gordon (general) (1670–1752), Scottish general who fought under Peter the Great in 1696–1711, and for the Jacobites in the Jacobite rising of 1715
Alexander Hamilton-Gordon (British Army officer, born 1817) (1817–1890), British Army general
Alexander Hamilton-Gordon (British Army officer, born 1859) (1859–1939), British Army lieutenant-general
Andrew Gordon (British Army officer) (died 1806), British Army lieutenant-general
Charles George Gordon (1833–1885), British Army major-general and administrator also known as Chinese Gordon and Gordon of Khartoum
Cosmo Gordon (1736–1800), British Army general
Desmond Gordon (1911–1997), British Army major general
Frederick Gordon (British Army officer) (1861–1927), British Army brigadier and temporary major-general in the early Royal Air Force
George Gordon, 4th Earl of Huntly (1514–1562), Scottish nobleman and commander of the King's Army at the Battle of Haddon Rig
George Gordon, 5th Duke of Gordon (1770–1836), Scottish British Army general
George Gordon-Lennox (1908–1988), British Army lieutenant-general
Hugh Gordon (British Army officer) (1760–1823), British Army lieutenant general
James Gordon (British Army officer, born 1957), British Army major-general
James Willoughby Gordon (1772–1851), British Army general
John James Hood Gordon (1832–1908), British Army general
John William Gordon (1814–1870), British Army major-general
Patrick Gordon (1635–1699), Scottish general and rear admiral in Russia
Robert Gordon (British Army officer) (born 1950), British Army major general
Robert Gordon-Finlayson (1881–1956), British Army general
Robert Gordon-Finlayson (British Army officer, born 1916) (1916–2001), British Army major general
Thomas Edward Gordon (1832–1914), British Army general
William Gordon (British Army officer) (1736–1818), British Army general

United States
B. Frank Gordon (1826–1866), acting Confederate States Army general in the American Civil War
George Gordon (Civil War general) (1836–1911), Confederate States Army general in the American Civil War
George Henry Gordon (1823–1886), Union Army general in the American Civil War
James B. Gordon (1822–1864), Confederate States Army general in the American Civil War
John A. Gordon (born 1946), U.S. Air Force general
John Brown Gordon (1832-1904), Confederate States Army general in the American Civil War
Walter Henry Gordon (1863–1924), U.S. Army major general
William F. Gordon (1787–1858), Virginia Militia major general
William Washington Gordon II (1834–1912), U.S. Army brigadier general

Others
Humberto Gordon (1927–2000), Chilean Army general
Ian Gordon (general) (born 1952), Australian Army major general
Joseph Maria Gordon (1856–1929), Australian Army major-general

Other uses
General Gordon Elementary School, Vancouver, British Columbia, Canada

See also
Fred A. Gorden (born 1940), U.S. Army major general
, a troop transport
Attorney General Gordon (disambiguation)

Title and name disambiguation pages